Ger is a commune in the Manche department in north-western France. The Musée régional de la poterie (regional pottery museum) is located in the commune.

See also
Communes of the Manche department
Parc naturel régional Normandie-Maine

References

Communes of Manche